Sataua is a village on the island of Savai'i in Samoa. It is situated at the northwestern end of the island in the district of Vaisigano. The population is 833.

References

Populated places in Vaisigano